Events from the year 1837 in the Kingdom of Spain.

Incumbents
Monarch: Isabella II
Regent: Maria Christina of the Two Sicilies
Prime Minister - 
 until 18 August - José María Calatrava y Peinado  
 18 August-18 October - Baldomero Espartero, Prince of Vergara 
 18 October-16 December - Eusebio Bardají y Azara
 starting 16 December - Narciso Fernández de Heredia, 2nd Count of Heredia-Spínola

Events
March 16 - Battle of Oriamendi
March 24 - Battle of Huesca
August 24 - Battle of Villar de los Navarros
September - Battle of Aranzueque

Births

Date unknown
Miguel Villalba Hervás (1837–1899), politician, lawyer, journalist and historian

Deaths
July 27 - Pablo Morillo
Pedro Sarsfield

See also
First Carlist War

 
1830s in Spain
Years of the 19th century in Spain